was a Japanese clan in Mutsu Province.

History
The Kasai clan was established in the 12th century.

In the 17th century, the family were given a monopoly for cleaning the sewer pits of Edo Castle.

References

External links
   "Kasai family' at Library of Congress Subject Headings

Japanese clans